Vaasan Sport Naiset were a women's ice hockey team in Finland. They played in Vaasa, on the west coast of Finland, at the Vaasan Sähkö Areena. Founded in 1983, the team most recently played in the Naisten Liiga from the 2018–19 season until being relegated at the conclusion of the 2021–22 season . The team was dissolved following relegation.

History
The women’s representative team of Vaasan Sport debuted in the Naisten SM-sarja, predecessor of the Naisten Liiga, in the 1983–84 season. Sport quickly established themselves as a competitive team, finishing in the top half of the league during their first five seasons and achieving Finnish Championship bronze in 1986. The 1988–89 season was the first time the team finished in the bottom of the league, ranking seventh of eight teams. Following the disappointing season, the team was financially relegated.

Vaasan Sport gained promotion to the SM-sarja in 1993 but the team struggled with the high level of competition and finished in last place. They were able to stave off relegation in the 1993–94 qualifiers but were unable to do so in the following season and were relegated to the Naisten I-divisioona (renamed Naisten Mestis in 2012) in 1995.

In the following two decades, Vaasan Sport played in either the second-tier I-divisioona or third-tier Naisten II-divisioona (renamed Naisten Suomi-sarja in 2003). The team spent at least seven consecutive seasons in the Suomi-sarja prior to their return to the Mestis in the 2015–16 season. The return to Mestis marked a positive shift in the performance of the team and they continued to markedly improve over the ensuing seasons, culminating in their promotion to the Naisten Liiga for the 2018–19 season.

Players and personnel

2021–22 roster 

Coaching staff and team personnel
 Head coach: Susanne Uppgård
 Assistant coach: Juhani Sarilo
 Goaltending coach: Jonathan Iilahti
 Goaltending coach: Vesa Perkiö
 Team manager: Leena Kuusisto
 Equipment managers: Jani Kuusisto & Mika Myllyniemi

Team captaincy history 
 Susanne Uppgård, 2015–2016
 Elina Ojala, 2016–2020
 Pauliina Suoniemi, 2020–2022

Head coaches 
 Ove Kvist, 2013–2017
 Mika Nummi, 2017–2019
 Marko Haapala, 2019–1 December 2020
 Susanne Uppgård, 1 December 2020–2022

Team honours

Finnish Championship 
  Naisten SM-sarja Third Place (1): 1986

Notable alumni 
Years active with Sport listed alongside players' names.
Sari Krooks, 1983–1989 & 1993–94
Hanna Hakala, 1986–1988
Tiina Suominen, 1986–1988
Ida Kuoppala, 2017–2019

References

External links 
Team information and statistics from Eliteprospects.com and Eurohockey.com
Official site (in Finnish)

Naisten Liiga (ice hockey) teams
Sport in Vaasa
1983 establishments in Finland